Barker Burnell (January 30, 1798 – June 15, 1843) was a U.S. Representative from Massachusetts.

Early life
Burnell was born on January 30, 1798, in Nantucket, Massachusetts.

State Public service

Massachusetts General Court
Burnell served as member of the Massachusetts House of Representatives in 1821-1822, and as a member of the Massachusetts Senate in 1823, from 1825 to 1833, and in 1838.

Massachusetts Constitutional convention of 1820
Burnell was  a member of the Massachusetts constitutional convention of 1820.

Whig National Convention
Burnell served as delegate to the Whig National Convention in 1840.

Member of the US Congress
Burnell was elected as a Whig to the Twenty-seventh and Twenty-eighth Congresses and served from March 4, 1841, until his death in Washington, D.C., June 15, 1843.

Burial
He was interred in Congressional Cemetery.  Burnell was re-interred in Prospect Hill Cemetery, Nantucket, Massachusetts, in 1844.

See also
List of United States Congress members who died in office (1790–1899)

References

1798 births
1843 deaths
Burials at the Congressional Cemetery
Massachusetts state senators
Members of the Massachusetts House of Representatives
People from Nantucket, Massachusetts
Whig Party members of the United States House of Representatives from Massachusetts
19th-century American politicians